Armando Miranda (12 December 1939 – 7 April 1980) was a Brazilian professional footballer who played as a forward.

1939 births
1980 deaths
Brazilian footballers
Brazilian expatriate footballers
Expatriate footballers in Italy
Expatriate footballers in Colombia
Sport Club Corinthians Paulista players
CR Flamengo footballers
Serie A players
Juventus F.C. players
Catania S.S.D. players
Categoría Primera A players
Atlético Junior footballers
Brazilian expatriate sportspeople in Italy
Brazilian expatriate sportspeople in Colombia
Association football forwards
Footballers from São Paulo